Jordan contains one of the oldest Christian communities in the world, their presence dating back to the crucifixion of Jesus Christ early in the 1st century AD. Christians today make up about 3% of the population. Jordanian Christians in a country of almost 10 million are thought to number 250,000–400,000, down from 20% in 1930, but their absolute numbers have increased. This is due to high immigration rate of Muslims into Jordan, higher emigration rates of Christians and higher birth rates for Muslims. All Christian religious ceremonies are allowed to be publicly celebrated in Jordan.

Jordan's Arab Christians are exceptionally well integrated in the Jordanian society and enjoy a high level of freedom. Christians are allotted a minimum of 7% of the seats in the Jordanian parliament (9 out of 130 seats), significantly greater than their percentage of the total Jordanian population. Jordanian Christians also hold important ministerial portfolios, ambassadorial appointments, and positions of high military rank. The highest position reached by a Jordanian Christian is Deputy Prime Minister, most recently held by Rajai Muasher.

History

Jordanian Christians are among the oldest Christian communities in the world, and the majority have always been Orthodox adherents to the Orthodox Patriarchate of Jerusalem and the Holy Land, which is the 16 Church of St. James, and was founded during Jesus’s lifetime. The Jordanian Orthodox Christians are believed to be around 300,000. Many of them are descended from the Ancient Arab Ghassanid and Lakhmid Tribes, and they have throughout history shared the fate and the struggles of their fellow Muslim tribesmen.

In the year 630, during the Islamic prophet Muhammad's lifetime, many Jordanian Christians joined Muhammad's army led by his adopted son Zeid ibn Haritha and his cousin Jafar bin Abi Taleb, and fought against the Byzantine army of their fellow Orthodox Christians at the Battle of Mutah in Karak (it is because of this battle that they earned their tribal name "'Uzaizat" which means "the reinforcements"—and Archbishop Fouad Twal himself comes from these tribes). In 1099, during the First Crusade, some were killed by Crusaders at the Fall of Jerusalem alongside the Muslims. 

Later from 1916–1918 during the Great Arab Revolt they fought with the Muslim Arabs against the Ottoman forces; they thereafter languished for a few decades along with their Muslim fellows under a Protestant Colonial Mandate, and in the Israeli Arab Wars of 1948, 1967 and 1968 they fought with Muslim Arabs against Israel. Christian Jordanians have not only defended Jordan, but have also helped to build Jordan, playing leading roles in the fields of politics, education, health, commerce, tourism, agriculture, science, culture and numerous other fields.

Role in Jordanian society
Christians are exceptionally well integrated in the Jordanian society and have a high level of freedom, though they are not free to evangelize Muslims.  They form a significant part of the kingdom's political and economic elite. Christians enjoy high economic and social opportunities in the Hashemite Kingdom of Jordan compared to the position of some, but not all, of their co-religionists in the rest of the Middle East. Christians are allotted 9 out of a total of 130 seats in the Jordanian parliament, and also hold important ministerial portfolios, ambassadorial appointments, and positions of high military rank.

Jordanian Christians are allowed by the public and private sectors to leave their work to attend mass on Sundays.  All Christian religious ceremonies are publicly celebrated in Jordan, Christians have established good relations with the royal family and the various Jordanian government officials, and they have their own ecclesiastical courts for matters of personal status. The government has contributed to restoring pilgrimages to the baptismal site of Jesus Christ. Jordanian Christians of the evangelical church created the Jordan Evangelical Council in 2006. The most recent elections in September 2019 elected Reverend Habes Nimat as president and Reverend David Rihani as vice president.

Christians involved in Jordanian politics include; Rajai Muasher Dababneh, currently Deputy Prime Minister. Also Dina Kawar, current Jordanian Ambassador to the U.S., was the first Arab woman to lead the Security Council through Jordan's seat who also happens to be a Jordanian Christian.

King Abdullah II is an ardent supporter of Arab Christians:

Demographics
Jordanian Christians number around 250,000, most of whom are ethnically Arab, according to a 2014 estimate by the Orthodox Church. The study excluded minority Christian groups and the thousands of Iraqi and Syrian Christians residing in Jordan.

The majority of Jordanian Christians belong to the Eastern Orthodox Church, estimated between 125,000–300,000, while Catholics number 114,000 and Protestants 30,000. There has been an influx of Christian refugees escaping the Islamic State mainly from Mosul, Iraq numbering about 7,000 and 20,000 from Syria. Conversion of a Muslim to another religion is technically not allowed. 

However, there are cases in which a Muslim will adopt the Christian faith, secretly declaring their faith. In effect, they are practising Christians, but legally Muslims; thus, the statistics of Jordanian Christians does not include Muslim converts to Christianity. A 2015 study estimates some 6,500 believers in Christ from a Muslim background in Jordan.

Denominations
Among the recognized denominations the Greek Orthodox, Roman Catholic (Latin), Melkite Greek Catholic, Armenian Orthodox, Maronite Catholic, Anglican, and Syriac Orthodox Church make up the majority of Jordan's Christian population. Also the Lutheran, Coptic Orthodox, Seventh-day Adventist, United Pentecostal, Latter-day Saints, and Presbyterian churches are recognized denominations while they make up a much smaller proportion of the Christian population.

In addition to the recognized denominations there are religious societies that are allowed to meet freely, but are not recognized as churches by the government. The recognized religious societies are the Evangelical Free Church, the Church of the Nazarene, the Assembly of God, the Baptist Church, and the Christian and Missionary Alliance.

Christian denominations in Jordan belong to four major denominational groups:

 Protestantism:
 Evangelical
 Anglican Bishop in Jerusalem
 Lutheran
 Seventh-day Adventist
 United Pentecostal
 Presbyterian
 Eastern Orthodox
 Greek Orthodox Patriarchate of Jerusalem
 Oriental Orthodox:
 Armenian Patriarchate of Jerusalem
 Syriac Orthodox Church
 Coptic Orthodox Church
 Catholic:
 Latin Patriarchate of Jerusalem
 Melkite Catholic Archeparchy of Petra
 Syriac Catholic Patriarchal Exarchate of Jerusalem
 Armenian Catholic Church

Sites

Biblical sites
Jordan is part of the Holy Land and has several biblical attractions that attract pilgrimage and tourist activities.
Biblical sites include; Al-Maghtas where Jesus was baptized by John the Baptist, Mount Nebo where Moses looked on to the Promised Land, Umm ar-Rasas a fortified Roman garrison that contains 16 Byzantine churches, Madaba that holds the Madaba Map which is the oldest mosaic map of the Holy Land, Machaerus which is a fortified hilltop overlooking the Dead Sea where John the Baptist was imprisoned and executed and Umm Qais (Gadara) where Jesus is thought to have expelled demons out of a man near the shores of the Sea of Galilee. In northern Jordan, there is a small creek where an angel met and wrestled with the patriarch Jacob.
The rock struck by Moses to bring forth water and the patriarch Aaron's tomb are both in southern Jordan. The ruins of the fortress of the Ammonites are on a mountain overlooking downtown Amman. This is the site where King David had Bathsheba's husband Uriah the Hittite killed.

Other sites
There are many Arab and Frankish castles from the period of the Crusades in Jordan. The most famous of which is Ajlun castle located in the Ajloun district in northern Jordan. Other castles include Montreal (Crusader castle) and Kerak.

Fuheis and Al Husn are two predominantly Christian towns of Jordan.

The world's oldest built church exists in the city of Aqaba, southern Jordan.

Christian institutions

Schools

There are many Christian schools in Jordan that educate students from both Christian and Muslim families. Some members of the royal family have attended a Christian school for a portion of their education.

The Rosary Sister's School is run by the Catholic Church.

The Franciscan Sisters School is run by the Franciscans.

The National Orthodox School is run by the Eastern Orthodox Church and has received The Cambridge Queen Rania Award multiple times.

The Ahliyyah School for Girls, the Bishop's School for Boys, and the Schneller School are run by the Anglican Church in Amman. There are also a school for the blind, a school for the deaf, and a school for physically handicapped students run by the Anglican church.

The Baptist School of Amman is administered by the Baptist church in Jordan and enrolls students of both genders. The Baptist School band has played at many official government occasions.

La Salle Amman is one of the most prestigious schools in Amman founded in 1950. An institute of the Brothers of the Christian Schools founded by Jean-Baptiste de la Salle. Along with Our Lady of Nazareth college and Terra Santa college.

Hospitals
The first hospital built in Jordan was the 'Evangelical Hospital' built in As-Salt by the Church Missionary Society.

The Italian Hospital in Amman and in Kerak were started by a Catholic surgeon and is entrusted to the Comboni Missionary Sisters. The Catholic Church also runs a maternity hospital and a general hospital in Irbid in northern Jordan.

The Government Hospital in Ajloun was originally run by Baptists.

The Annoor Sanatorium which treats tuberculosis and other lung diseases was founded by a Christian doctor. The Annoor Sanatorium is located outside of Mafraq in northern Jordan.

Several Mission Clinics were also founded across Jordan.

Gallery

See also

 Arab Christians
 Religion in Jordan
 Eastern Orthodoxy in Jordan
 Roman Catholicism in Jordan
 Jordanian Interfaith Coexistence Research Center
 Fuhais
 Armenians in Jordan

References

External links
 The Baptism Site of Jesus Christ – History